Jürgen Hentsch (March 17, 1936 in Görlitz – December 21, 2011 in Berlin) was a German actor. He was known for several movies and TV shows such as The Deathmaker (1995), In the Shadow of Power (2003) and Der Mann mit der Maske (1994). He was married to Wassilka Hentsch.

Selected filmography 
  (1991, TV film)
  (1994, TV film)
 Deathmaker (1995)
 Hannah (1997)
 Bloody Weekend (2000)
 Die Manns – Ein Jahrhundertroman (2001, TV miniseries)
  (2003, TV film)
 March of Millions (2007, TV film)

References

External links

1936 births
2011 deaths
German male television actors
German male film actors
20th-century German male actors
21st-century German male actors
People from Görlitz